Jake's Long Shadow  is a novel by Alan Duff, first published in 2002. It is the third book in the Once Were Warriors trilogy, following Jake "The Muss" Heke and his estranged family. Jake had previously driven his wife and children away because of his violent ways. The story shows new characters and their stories, such as Beth's new husband.

Unlike the previous two books, it has not yet had a film adaptation.

References

Novels by Alan Duff
2002 novels
21st-century New Zealand novels
Works about Māori people